Wolfgang Georg Louis Liebeneiner (6 October 1905 – 28 November 1987) was a German actor, film director and theatre director.

Beginnings
He was born in Liebau in Prussian Silesia. In 1928, he was taught by Otto Falckenberg, the director of the Munich Kammerspiele, in acting and directing.

Nazi era
In 1936, Liebeneiner became a member of the Prussian State Theater in Berlin and in 1938, he became artistic director of the German Film Academy Babelsberg. In 1941, he directed the film Ich klage an (I accuse) in cooperation with the Ministry of Public Enlightenment and Propaganda. The film was about voluntary euthanasia of a woman suffering from multiple sclerosis, but was intended to support the T4 euthanasia program. He received a doctorate in the years from 1942 to 1945 while working for Universum Film AG, the largest German film studio at that time.

Post war
In 1947, Liebeneiner directed the debut of Wolfgang Borchert's play  (The Man Outside) in the Hamburg Kammerspiele. In 1956 he was successful with the film The Trapp Family.

He died on 28 November 1987 in Vienna after a long illness.

Personal life
Liebeneiner was married twice: first, from 1934 to the actress Ruth Hellberg, then from 1944 to the actress Hilde Krahl, with whom he had his daughter Johanna Liebeneiner, who also became an actress.

Selected filmography

Actor

 The Other Side (1931)
 Happy Days in Aranjuez (1933)
 Farewell Waltz (1934)
 Music in the Blood (1934)
 Asew (1935)
 Liebelei (1933, directed by Max Ophüls)
 A Love Story (1933)
 Enjoy Yourselves (1934)
 What Am I Without You (1934)
 A Night on the Danube (1935)
 Every Day Isn't Sunday (1935)
 Artist Love (1935)
 His Late Excellency (1935)
 The Blonde Carmen (1935)
 Friedemann Bach (1941)

Director
Film

 The Model Husband (1937)
 Don't Promise Me Anything (1937)
 You and I (1938)
 Yvette (1938)
 Target in the Clouds (1939)
 The Leghorn Hat (1939)
 Bismarck (1940)
 Ich klage an (1941)
 Die Entlassung (1942)
 Melody of a Great City (1943)
 Love '47 (1949)
 My Niece Susanne (1950)
  Abundance of Life (1950)
 When a Woman Loves (1950)
 The Blue Star of the South (1951)
 Gateway to Peace (1951)
 1. April 2000 (1952)
 The Dancing Heart (1953)
 The Stronger Woman (1953)
 The Beautiful Miller (1954)
 Love is Forever (1954)
 On the Reeperbahn at Half Past Midnight (1954)
 I Was an Ugly Girl (1955)
 Leave on Word of Honour (1955)
 The Trapp Family (1956)
 Winter in the Woods (1956)
 Queen Louise (1957)
 Goodbye, Franziska (1957)
 Immer wenn der Tag beginnt (1957)
 The Trapp Family in America (1958)
 Taiga (1958)
 Sebastian Kneipp (1958)
 My Daughter Patricia (1959)
 Jacqueline (1959)
 Ingeborg (1960)
 I'm Marrying the Director (1960)
 A Woman for Life (1960)
 Final Accord (1960)
 The Last Chapter (1961)
 Schweik's Awkward Years (1964)
 The World Revolves Around You (1964)
 When Sweet Moonlight Is Sleeping in the Hills (1969)
  (1977)
 Goetz von Berlichingen of the Iron Hand (1979)

Television
 Treasure Island (1966, TV miniseries) — (based on Treasure Island)
 Ein Schloß in Schweden (1967) — (based on Château en Suède by Françoise Sagan)
 Ein ehrenwerter Herr (1968) — (based on Un grand honnête homme by Jules Romains)
  (1968, TV miniseries) — (based on Tom Sawyer and Huckleberry Finn)
 Mister Barnett (1969) — (based on Monsieur Barnett by Jean Anouilh)
 Eine konsequente Frau (1971) — (based on The Constant Wife)
 Die sieben Ohrfeigen (1971) — (remake of Seven Slaps, 1937, based on a novel by )
 Besuch auf einem kleinen Planeten (1971) — (based on Visit to a Small Planet by Gore Vidal)
 Die Abenteuer des braven Soldaten Schwejk (1972, TV series) — (based on The Good Soldier Švejk)
 Gasparone (1973) — (based on Gasparone)
 Plaza Fortuna (1973) — (based on a novel by Gudrun Pausewang)
 Eine egoistische Liebe (1973) — (based on Sons and Lovers)
 Schwarzwaldmädel (1973) — (based on Schwarzwaldmädel)
  (1975–1976, TV series)
 Das kleine Hofkonzert (1976) — (based on Das kleine Hofkonzert)
 Die Abenteuer des braven Soldaten Schwejk, second season (1977, TV series) — (based on The Good Soldier Švejk)
 Das Drehbuch (1980) — (based on Le Scénario by Jean Anouilh)
 Der Garten (1983) — (based on a play by Tim Aspinall)
 Der Mustergatte (1983) — (based on Fair and Warmer)

References

External links

Photographs and literature
 Audio recordings with Wolfgang Liebeneiner in the Online Archive of the Österreichische Mediathek (Plays and interviews in German). Retrieved 18 September 2019

1905 births
1987 deaths
20th-century German male actors
German male film actors
German theatre directors
German film directors
German television directors
Nazi propagandists
Propaganda film directors
People from the Province of Silesia
German expatriates in Austria
People from Lubawka